The following represents the recent as well as the past results of the India national football team.

Results by decades

1938–1959

1960s

1970s

1980s

1990s

2000s

2010s

2020s

Unofficial

See also 
 Results
Women's national team
U-23 results
 List of India national football team hat-tricks
 India national football team records and statistics
 History of the India's FIFA World Rankings

References

External links
 India – Matches – FIFA.com
 Indian National Football Team Matches Database (1948–1999) – RSSSF
 The Indian National Team in International Football (indianfootball.com)